The 1975 All-Big Eight Conference football team consists of American football players chosen by various organizations for All-Big Eight Conference teams for the 1975 NCAA Division I football season.  The selectors for the 1975 season included the Associated Press (AP).

Offensive selections

Ends
 Henry Marshall, Missouri (AP)
 Don Hasselbeck, Colorado (AP)

Offensive tackles
 Mike Koncar, Colorado (AP)
 Mike Vaughan, Oklahoma (AP)

Offensive guards
 Terry Webb, Oklahoma (AP)
 Derrel Gofourth, Oklahoma State (AP)

Centers
 Rik Bonness, Nebraska (AP)

Quarterbacks
 Nolan Cromwell, Kansas (AP)

Backs
 Joe Washington, Oklahoma (AP)
 Terry Miller, Oklahoma State (AP)
 Terry Kunz, Colorado (AP)

Defensive selections

Defensive ends
 Jimbo Elrod, Oklahoma (AP)
 Bob Marlin, Nebraska (AP)

Defensive tackles
 Lee Roy Selmon, Oklahoma (AP)
 Mike Butler, Kansas (AP)

Middle guards
 Dewey Selmon, Oklahoma (AP)

Linebackers
 Gary Spani, Kansas State (AP)
 Gary Campbell, Colorado (AP)
 Wonder Morris, Nebraska (AP)

Cornerbacks
 Ken Downing, Missouri (AP)
 Kurt Knoff, Kansas (AP)

Safeties
 Zac Henderson, Oklahoma (AP)

Key

AP = Associated Press

See also
 1975 College Football All-America Team

References

All-Big Seven Conference football team
All-Big Eight Conference football teams